Juan de Salazar y Espinosa (1508–1560) was a Spanish explorer, founder of the Paraguayan city of Asunción. Born in the city of Espinosa de los Monteros in Burgos, Spain, not much is known about his early life. He married Isabel Contreras y Mendoza and had five children. He died on February 11, 1560, in Asuncion, Paraguay's capital.

In August 1535 he set sail from the Spanish port of Sanlúcar de Barrameda (Cadiz) as a member of the expeditionary Pedro de Mendoza, who set sail towards the region of the Río de la Plata, arriving to the estuary of the Rio de la Plata in January 1536. After assisting Pedro de Mendoza in the first foundation of Buenos Aires, Juan de Salazar de Espinosa was then sent to look for Juan de Ayolas, who had been sent earlier by Pedro de Mendoza to explore the northern rivers of the Paraná and Paraguay River. He managed to find another member of Ayolas' party, Domingo Martínez de Irala, holed up in the Puerto de la Candelaria, which was founded by Ayolas earlier in February 1537.

While continuing his trip in the search of Ayolas, he founded a fort on the eastern banks of the Paraguay River which he named "Our Lady of Asunción", due to coincidence of that day, August 15, being the Christian celebration of the Assumption of Mary. He then traveled as far as San Pedro to look for Ayolas, only to find that he had been killed by the Chaco Indians.

Juan de Salazar y Espinosa is credited for having founded the first permanent European settlement in this region of the Río de la Plata: Asunción, which would become the capital of Paraguay. In 1544, he was expelled to Spain for having taken sides along the disgraced former governor of the Río de la Plata, Álvar Núñez Cabeza de Vaca. He returned to the region nine years later, as a leader of the adventurous Sanabria expedition. He died in 1560 in the city he had founded, Asunción.

References

1508 births
1560 deaths
Spanish explorers